Ángel Alfonso Martínez Cervera (born September 4, 1965) is a Mexican football manager and former player.

Martínez had a 17-year club football career, most of them playing for Tigres UANL. After he retired from playing football, Martínez became a coach. He began managing Tigres' under-17 side in 2019.

References

1965 births
Living people
Association football defenders
Unión de Curtidores footballers
Atlético Español footballers
Tigres UANL footballers
Mexican football managers
Footballers from Coahuila
Mexican footballers
People from Piedras Negras, Coahuila